The Keo Commercial Historic District encompasses a cluster of commercial and industrial buildings that make up the economic center of the small city of Keo, Arkansas.  The district includes a two-block section of Main Street, anchored at its southern end by the Cobb Cotton Gin complex, and on the north by Arkansas Highway 232, where it extends a short way in both directions.  The community grew around the Cotten Belt Railroad line, which Main Street was laid out just west of.  The cotton gin complex has its origins in 1906, as a means for local farmers to process their cotton and send it on to market via the railroad.

The district was listed on the National Register of Historic Places in 2011.

See also
National Register of Historic Places listings in Lonoke County, Arkansas

References

Historic districts on the National Register of Historic Places in Arkansas
Buildings and structures in Lonoke County, Arkansas
National Register of Historic Places in Lonoke County, Arkansas